Sherry Acker (born June 16, 1959) is a former tennis player from the U.S. who was active in the late 1970s and first half of the 1980s.

Acker was taught tennis by her father who was the coach at Kalamazoo College. In 1971, she won the girls' national singles and doubles title for 12-year-olds. She attended Kalamazoo Central High School and played on the varsity boys' tennis team. She attended the University of Florida and turned pro in 1978.

In the doubles competition, her best result at a Grand Slam was reaching the semifinals at the 1979 US Open with Julie Anthony, losing to Billie Jean King and Martina Navratilova. At the same tournament, she reached the fourth round of the singles event in which she was beaten in three sets by top-seed Chris Evert. In the mixed doubles, partnering Larry Leeds, she reached the semifinals of the 1981 Wimbledon Championships, losing to second-seeds and eventual champions Betty Stöve and Frew McMillan.

In 1980, she reached the final of the singles event at the Women's Stuttgart Open as an unseeded player, losing in straight sets to top-seed and defending champion Tracy Austin.

WTA Tour finals

Singles (1 runner-up)

Doubles (1 title, 2 runners-up)

References

External links
 
 

1959 births
Living people
American female tennis players
Sportspeople from Kalamazoo, Michigan
20th-century American women
Tennis people from Michigan
Florida Gators women's tennis players